Tommy (NURP.41.DHZ56) was a pigeon who received the Dickin Medal in 1946 from the People's Dispensary for Sick Animals for bravery in service during the Second World War. Tommy was cited for delivering a valuable message from the Netherlands to Lancashire during difficult conditions while serving with the National Pigeon Service in July 1942.

See also
 List of individual birds

References

External links
 PDSA Dickin Medal

Recipients of the Dickin Medal
Individual domesticated pigeons